Sir Matthew Christopher Bourne  (born 13 January 1960) is a British choreographer whose work includes ballet, contemporary dance, dance theatre and musical theatre.

Career 
Sir Matthew Bourne (OBE) is a British choreographer, dancer and artistic director of dance company, New Adventures.

He is best known for his unique re-imaginings of traditional ballet, such as his 1995 production of Swan Lake, where he replaced the traditionally female corps-de-ballet with a male ensemble. Swan Lake (Bourne) went on to be the longest running ballet in London's West End and New York City's Broadway. The production earned him the title as the only British director to win both 'Best Choreographer' and 'Best Director' in the same year at the 1999 Tony Awards. On the iconic appeal of Swan Lake at the time, The New Yorker said, 'what was important about the gender switch was that it made this old love story romantic again, by making it seem dangerous.'

In 2016 he was knighted as part of Queen Elizabeth II 2016 New Year Honours list for 'Services to Dance'. His admirers say that he has 'broadened the definition of ballet in a way that has consistently appealed to young audiences' Sarasota Herald-Tribune.

Bourne has been creating notable works in dance, musical theatre and film since 1986. He has created many productions with his dance companies New Adventures and AMP, as well as choreographed musicals for the West End such as Mary Poppins and My Fair Lady. Productions include The Red Shoes (ballet), The Car Man (Bourne) (based on Bizet's Carmen) and Edward Scissorhands (dance) among many others. The company has often reinvented many traditional Tchaikovsky ballets, such as The Nutcracker and Sleeping Beauty, placing them in a new, filmic context to enliven their potential for storytelling for a modern audience. Bourne has also adapted famous cinema and literature for the stage, such as a dance version of Tim Burton's 1990 film Edward Scissorhands, Hans Christian Andersen and Pressburger's The Red Shoes (1948 film) and Wilde's The Picture of Dorian Gray.

Bourne is described after an interview with the New Yorker in 2007 as a particularly 'audience-conscious artist'. Bourne highlights the importance of intervals for the audience, "in the second half they’re always more demonstrative, because they’ve talked to their friends and decided that it’s O.K. to enjoy it." He goes on to explain how he always asks company dancers to offer warmth in their curtain calls, saying "I pride myself on my company’s curtain calls, I really do. I think you won’t see a nicer curtain call than from my lot."

New Adventures 

The company, formerly known as 'Adventures in Motion Pictures' (see New Adventures (dance company)) was first established in 1987 by a group of Laban graduates. After the success of Swan Lake, AMP (Adventures in Motion Pictures) was heading down a highly commercial route. Long-running international tours of Swan Lake meant the company felt headed for world domination, which made Bourne uneasy, "I felt that I was running an office rather than a company". The pressure to create highly profitable productions left Bourne feeling creatively stifled. Feeling the need to be closer to his productions and seeking room to experiment and work with a smaller team, Bourne and AMP's co-director Katherine Doré eventually made the decision to split.

In 2000, he started a new company, New Adventures, which was officially formed with Managing Director Robert Noble OBE (also Deputy Managing Director of Cameron Mackintosh) and Bourne's long time collaborator, and former dancer, Etta Murfitt MBE as Associate Artistic Director. This enabled Bourne and the company to scale down and create low budget shows, working in close collaboration with the dancers and artists who contribute hugely to his creative process. Esteemed dance critic Judith Mackrell notes, 'there were moments in his career when Bourne could easily have let himself become a commercial commodity and squandered his talent (The Guardian).'

Personal life 

Matthew started his dance training at the comparatively late age of 22 and trained at Trinity Laban in London and before that he describes himself as self-taught. He explains to The Guardian “my first ever dance class was my audition for dance college when I was 21”. In the same interview, he paints a picture of his younger self as a keen autograph hunter, frequently taking the bus to the West End to meet the stars of the stage, and later being starstruck when making Barbara Streisand's Christmas List.

Bourne is now in a long-term relationship with contemporary dance choreographer Arthur Pita, who has been penned as the 'David Lynch of dance' (Guardian) who says of their relationship, "we talk about work a lot, but it's never competitive, our styles are so different". The two met through Bourne's production of Swan Lake, when Bourne was director and Arthur was a swan.

In addition to his highest accolade the 2016 honorary title of knighthood, Bourne has also received multiple awards and award nominations, including the Laurence Olivier Award, Tony Award, and Drama Desk Award, and has also received several honorary doctorates of arts from UK universities.

Stage Productions 

 Spitfire – 1988
 The Infernal Galop – 1989
 Town & Country – 1991
 Watch with Mother – 1991
 Deadly Serious – 1992
 Percy of Fitzrovia – 1992
 Nutcracker! – 1992
 Highland Fling – 1994
 Swan Lake – 1995
 Cinderella – 1997
 The Car Man – 2000
 Play Without Words – 2002
 Edward Scissorhands – 2005
 Dorian Gray – 2008
 Lord of the Flies – 2011
 Early Adventures – 2012
 Sleeping Beauty – 2012
 The Red Shoes – 2016
 Romeo and Juliet – 2019
 The Midnight Bell – 2021

Film & TV
 Drip: A Narcissistic Love Story – 1993 BBC TV
 Late Flowering Lust – 1993 BBC TV
 Swan Lake – 1995, 2011 & 2019
 Nutcracker! – 2001 & 2022
 Matthew Bourne's Christmas – 2012 Channel 4
 The Car Man – 2001 & 2015
 Sleeping Beauty – 2013
 Cinderella – 2017
 Romeo and Juliet – 2019

Awards & Nominations
 1996 Time Out Special Award
 1996 Southbank Show Award
 1996 Laurence Olivier Award for Best New Dance Production -  Swan Lake
 1997 Honorary Fellow - The Laban Centre
 1999 Astaire Award - Special Award for Direction, Choreography and Concept of Swan Lake 
 1999 Drama Desk Award Outstanding Director of a Musical – Swan Lake
 1999 Drama Desk Award Outstanding Choreography – Swan Lake
 1999 Tony Award Best Choreography – Swan Lake
 1999 Tony Award Best Direction of a Musical – Swan Lake
 2000 Evening Standard Award for Musical Event – The Car Man
 2001 Officer of the Order of the British Empire (OBE) for Services to Dance
 2003 Hamburg Shakespeare Prize For The Arts - Only the second recipient from the dance world in over 50 years. The other being the legendary ballerina, Dame Margot Fonteyn.
 2003 Laurence Olivier Award for Best Theatre Choreographer - Play Without Words
 2005 Laurence Olivier Award for Best Original Choreography – Mary Poppins (shared with Stephen Mear)
 2007 Drama Desk Award Unique Theatrical Experience – Edward Scissorhands
 2007 Theatre Managers Special Award (TMA) for Individual Achievement - For services to Dance Touring and Audience Development
 2007 Honorary Doctor of Arts from De Montfort University, Leicester.
 2010 Honorary Doctor of Arts from Plymouth University.
 2010 The British Inspiration Award - Winner in Arts Category
 2011 Honorary Doctorate - Kingston University
 2011 Honorary Doctorate - Roehampton University
 2011 Companion - Trinity Laban Conservatoire of Music and Dance
 2012 LIPA Companion (Liverpool Institute of Performing Arts) Presented by Sir Paul McCartney
 2013 De Valois Award for Outstanding Achievement - National Dance Awards
 2013 Dance Film Association 'Dance in Focus' Award - given for 'persistence of vision, drive and artistry'
 2014 The Sir George Monoux Founders Award - Presented at the Dedication Ceremony of The Matthew Bourne Theatre, Monoux College, Walthamstow, London
 2015 Primio Ravenna Festival - Ravenna Festival Highest Honour - Previous recipients include Rostropovich, Ennio Morricone, Riccardo Muti and Pierre Boulez 
 2015 The UK Theatre Award for Outstanding Contribution to British Theatre
 2016 Knighthood for Services To Dance - New Years Honours 
 2016 Queen Elizabeth II Coronation (QEII) Award in recognition of outstanding services to the art of ballet 
 2016 Honorary Doctorate of Arts - Royal Conservatoire of Scotland
 2016 The Gene Kelly Legacy Award from Dizzy Feet Foundation
 2016 Critics’ Circle Distinguished Service to Art Award 
 2017 Trailblazer in Dance and Theatre Award from The International Institute of Dance and Theatre
 2017 Olivier Award for Best Theatre Choreographer - The Red Shoes
 2019 Special Olivier Award in recognition of his extraordinary achievements in dance
 2020 Olivier Award for Best Theatre Choreographer - Mary Poppins (shared with Stephen Mear)
 2021 Best Modern Choreography for 'The Midnight Bell' at National Dance Awards

Nominations
 2010 Laurence Olivier Award for Best Theatre Choreography – Oliver!
 2000 Laurence Olivier Award for Outstanding Achievement in Dance – The Car Man
 2005 Drama Desk Award Outstanding Director of a Musical – Play Without Words
 2005 Drama Desk Award Outstanding Choreography – Play Without Words
 2007 Drama Desk Award Outstanding Choreography – Edward Scissorhands
 2007 Drama Desk Award Outstanding Choreography – Mary Poppins
 2007 Tony Award Best Choreography – Mary Poppins
 2017 Best Modern Choreography for The Red Shoes - National Dance Awards 2017

References

Further reading

External links 
 
 
 
 .
  – an interview with Matthew Bourne with advice for teenagers.

1960 births
Living people
Drama Desk Award winners
English choreographers
Helpmann Award winners
National Dance Award winners
Officers of the Order of the British Empire
Laurence Olivier Award winners
People from Walthamstow
Tony Award winners
English gay men
Knights Bachelor